The Third Kiss is a 1942 Argentine romantic drama film directed by Luis César Amadori and starring Pedro López Lagar, Silvia Legrand and Amelia Bence.  At the 1943 Argentine Film Critics Association Awards, Amelia Bence won the  Silver Condor Award for Best Actress for her performance in the film.

Cast
Pedro López Lagar
Silvia Legrand
Amelia Bence
Francisco Álvarez
Billy Days
Domingo Márquez
Gloria Bayardo
Aurelia Ferrer
Rosa Martín
Arturo Bamio

References

External links
 

1942 films
1940s Spanish-language films
Argentine black-and-white films
Films directed by Luis César Amadori
Argentine romantic drama films
1942 romantic drama films
1940s Argentine films